Moussa Diabaté (born 21 January 2002) is a French professional basketball player for the Los Angeles Clippers of the National Basketball Association (NBA), on a two-way contract with the Ontario Clippers of the NBA G League. He played college basketball for the Michigan Wolverines. Diabaté was a consensus five-star recruit and one of the top centers in the 2021 class.

Early life and youth career
Born in Paris to Malian and Guinean parents, Diabaté started playing basketball at age 12 with Sporting Club Maccabi de Paris. After a few months, he moved to USD Charonne, where his interest in the sport formed, and he later competed for Saint Charles de Charenton Saint Maurice. Diabaté was not allowed into the sports institute CREPS for academic reasons. At age 14, he moved to the United States to advance his basketball career. In eighth grade, he joined the middle school program of Montverde Academy in Montverde, Florida. At first, he did not speak English and struggled to adjust to the American style of play.

High school career
As a freshman in high school, Diabaté played for Florida Preparatory Academy in Melbourne, Florida. For his sophomore season, he transferred to DME Academy in Daytona Beach, Florida. Diabaté grabbed 30 rebounds in a game against Marshall County High School. As a sophomore, he averaged 17.9 points, 11.1 rebounds and 2.2 assists per game. After the season, Diabaté competed for Nightrydas Elite at the Nike Elite Youth Basketball League. 

For his junior season, he moved to IMG Academy in Bradenton, Florida. In December 2019, Diabaté helped his team reach the City of Palms Classic final. He participated in the Basketball Without Borders Global Camp during NBA All-Star Weekend in February 2020. As a junior, Diabaté averaged 14.5 points and seven rebounds per game. In his senior season, he averaged 14.1 points and 7.5 rebounds per game, and led his team to a 21–3 record. He was selected to the McDonald's All-American Game and Jordan Brand Classic rosters.

Recruiting
Diabaté was a consensus five-star recruit and one of the top power forwards in the 2021 class. On 9 November 2020, he committed to playing college basketball for Michigan over offers from Arizona, Kentucky and Memphis, among others.

College career
On 20 February 2022, Diabaté was involved in the postgame melee following a 77–63 loss to Wisconsin and appeared to throw punches. He was suspended one game by the Big Ten Conference for his role in the brawl. Diabaté was named to the Big Ten All-Freshman Team. He averaged 9.0 points and 6.0 rebounds in his freshman season. On 25 April 2022, he declared for the 2022 NBA draft while maintaining his college eligibility. However, on 1 June 2022, Diabaté announced he would remain in the draft and forego his remaining eligibility.

Professional career

Los Angeles Clippers (2022–present) 
Diabaté was selected with the 43rd overall pick by the Los Angeles Clippers in the 2022 NBA draft. Diabaté joined the Clippers' 2022 NBA Summer League roster. In his Summer League debut, Diabaté scored ten points and seven rebounds in a 94–76 win over the Memphis Grizzlies. On July 22, 2022, Diabaté signed a two-way contract with the Clippers. 

On October 22, 2022, Diabaté dressed for the second game of the season for the 2022–23 Los Angeles Clippers but did not play. The second time he dressed, he played in the team's 5th game on October 27, for 1:47 accumulating an assist, steal, 2 rebounds, a field goal and a free throw against the Sacramento Kings. On December 17, in his 8th NBA game, with Paul George, Ivica Zubac, Reggie Jackson and Norman Powell unable to play, he made his first start at home against the Washington Wizards.

National team career
Diabaté led France to fourth place at the 2018 FIBA U16 European Championship in Novi Sad, Serbia. He averaged 11.1 points and 10.3 rebounds per game, recording 16 points and 17 rebounds against Serbia in the quarterfinals. At the 2019 FIBA U18 European Championship in Volos, Greece, he averaged 13.1 points, 11.1 rebounds and 2.1 blocks per game for France, who came in fifth place. In a group stage win over Greece, Diabaté recorded 14 points and 20 rebounds.

Career statistics

College

|-
| style="text-align:left;"| 2021–22
| style="text-align:left;"| Michigan
| 32 || 26 || 24.9 || .542 || .214 || .619 || 6.0 || .8 || .3 || .9 || 9.0

References

External links

Michigan Wolverines bio

2002 births
Living people
Basketball players from Paris
Black French sportspeople
French expatriate basketball people in the United States
French men's basketball players
French sportspeople of Guinean descent
French sportspeople of Malian descent
IMG Academy alumni
Los Angeles Clippers draft picks
Los Angeles Clippers players
McDonald's High School All-Americans
Michigan Wolverines men's basketball players
National Basketball Association players from France
Power forwards (basketball)